Dalima patularia is a moth of the family Geometridae. It is found in the Himalaya, northern Thailand, western China, Borneo, Sumatra and Sulawesi.

External links
The Moths of Borneo

Boarmiini
Moths described in 1860